Magomedemin Magomedrasulovich Rabadanov (born 5 February 2002) is a Russian football player. He plays as a midfielder for FC Yessentuki.

Club career
He made his debut in the Russian Premier League for FC Ufa on 22 July 2020 in a game against FC Arsenal Tula, replacing Gamid Agalarov in the 87th minute.

References

External links
 
 
 

2002 births
Living people
Russian footballers
Russia youth international footballers
Association football forwards
FC Ufa players
Russian Premier League players